The modes of persuasion, modes of appeal or rhetorical appeals are strategies of rhetoric that classify a speaker's or writer's appeal to their audience. These include ethos, pathos, and logos, all three of which appear in Aristotle's Rhetoric.

Ethos

Ethos (plural: ethea) is an appeal to the authority or credibility of the presenter. It is how well the presenter convinces the audience that the presenter is qualified to speak on the subject. This can be done by:
Being a notable figure in the field in question, such as a college professor or an executive of a company whose business is related to the presenter's topic
Demonstrating mastery of the terminology of the field (jargon)
Being introduced by or producing bona fides from other established authorities

Pathos

Pathos (plural: pathea) is an appeal to the audience's emotions. The terms sympathy, pathetic, and empathy are derived from it. It can be in the form of metaphor, simile, a passionate delivery, or even a simple claim that a matter is unjust. Pathos can be particularly powerful if used well, but most speeches do not solely rely on pathos.  Pathos is most effective when the author or speaker demonstrates agreement with an underlying value of the reader or listener.

In addition, the speaker may use pathos and fear to sway the audience. Pathos may also include appeals to audience imagination and hopes, done when the speaker paints a scenario of positive future results of following the course of action proposed.

In some cases, downplaying the ethos can be done while emphasizing pathos, for example as William Jennings Bryan did in his Cross of Gold speech:

Logos

Logos (plural: logoi) is logical appeal or the simulation of it, and the term logic is derived from it. It is normally used to describe facts and figures that support the speaker's claims or thesis. There are also more traditional forms of logical reasoning, such as syllogisms and enthymemes. Having a logos appeal also enhances ethos because information makes the speaker look knowledgeable and prepared to their audience. However, the data can be confusing and thus confuse the audience. Logos can also be misleading or inaccurate, however meaningful it may seem to the subject at hand. In some cases, inaccurate, falsified, or misconstrued even be used to enact a pathos effect. Such is the case with casualty numbers, which, while not necessarily falsified, may include minor casualties (injuries) that are equated with deaths in the mind of an audience and therefore can evoke the same effect as a death toll.

Kairos

Kairos (plural: kairoi) is an arguable fourth mode of persuasion which means the "right time", "season" or "opportunity".  Kairos is an appeal to the timeliness or context in which a presentation is publicized, which includes contextual factors external to the presentation itself but still capable of affecting the audience's reception to its arguments or messaging, such as the time in which a presentation is taking place, the place in which an argument or message is being made, the background information and demographics of an audience such as age, culture, faith, creed, etc., the appropriateness of the speaker's tone given the nature of the occasion, and the relationship between the speaker, the audience and the topic.

An example would be an outdated advertisement that would have been effective 40 years ago but hasn't aged well by today's standards.  If both the advertisement made 40 years ago and the exact same advertisement made today contain the same speaker with the same credentials (ethos), and the same arguments with the same logic (logos), and they both appeal to the same emotions and the same values (pathos), but the reception is completely different, then what has changed is the context in which the presentation was made (kairos).

References

External links

 
Rhetorical techniques